Paloma Dawkins is a cartoonist, animator and video game creator who is known for works that blur the line between natural and game environments. Her works include Gardenarium (2015), 
Alea (2015), 
Palmystery 
and Museum of Symmetry.  Her games from game jams include Paint Bug (2016) and Egg Boss (2014).

References

Further reading

External links 

 
 Games at itch.io

Living people
Canadian cartoonists
Canadian animators
Canadian video game designers
Canadian women cartoonists
Canadian women animators
Women video game designers
Year of birth missing (living people)